Novy Varyash (Yañı Wäräş) is a rural locality (a village) in Starovaryashsky Selsoviet, Yanaulsky District, Bashkortostan, Russia. The population was 96 as of 2010. There is 1 street.

Geography 
Novy Varyash is located 44 km southeast of Yanaul (the district's administrative centre) by road. Stary Varyash is the nearest rural locality.

References 

Rural localities in Yanaulsky District